Between 1965 and 2010, the John Whiting Award (from 2007 renamed the Peter Wolff Trust Supports the John Whiting Award) was awarded annually to a British or Commonwealth playwright who, in the opinion of a consortium of UK theatres, showed a new and distinctive development in dramatic writing with particular relevance to contemporary society. The award was established in 1965 to commemorate John Whiting and his distinctive contribution to post-war British theatre.  Until 2006, the selection was made by the drama panel of Arts Council England, and the play did not need to have been staged, which allowed plays produced on radio to be considered.

From 2007, only plays which had been performed in the subsidised sector were eligible.  The award was initially worth £1000, but grew to  £6000 per year. From 2007, the award was supplied by the Peter Wolff Theatre Trust and was administered by a consortium of UK theatres which specialise in new writing.

The theatres involved were:
Birmingham Repertory Theatre
Bush Theatre, London
Cleanbreak, London
Hampstead Theatre, London
Liverpool Everyman
Liverpool Playhouse
Nottingham Playhouse
Nuffield Theatre, Southampton
Paines Plough, London (touring)
Royal Court Theatre, London
Sgript Cymru, Cardiff
Soho Theatre, London
Tamasha Theatre Company, London
Traverse Theatre, Edinburgh

External links
Arts Council England
Peter Wolff Theatre Trust
Birmingham Repertory Theatre
Bush Theatre
Cleanbreak
Hampstead Theatre
Liverpool Everyman & Playhouse
Nottingham Playhouse
Nuffield Theatre
Paines Plough
Royal Court Theatre
Sgript Cymru
Soho Theatre
Tamasha Theatre Company
Traverse Theatre
The Stage
 http://twp.posterous.com/shortlist-announced-peter-wolff-theatre-trust

British theatre awards
British literary awards
Dramatist and playwright awards
Awards established in 1965
1965 establishments in the United Kingdom